Spain women's national goalball team is the women's national team of Spain.  Goalball is a team sport designed specifically for athletes with a vision impairment.  The team takes part in international competitions.

Paralympic Games  
 

The team competed at the 1992 Summer Paralympics in Barcelona, where they finished eighth. At the 1996 Summer Paralympics in Atlanta, Georgia, the team finished fourth. The team competed at the 2000 Summer Paralympics in Sydney, where they finished second.

World Championships  

IBSA World Goalball Championships have been held every four years from 1978.  

The 1994 World Championships were held in Colorado Springs, Colorado.  The team was one of nine teams participating, and they finished seventh overall. The 1998 World Championships were held in Madrid, Spain.  The team was one of eleven teams participating, and they finished fifth overall. The 2002 World Championships were held in Rio de Janeiro, Brazil.  The team was one of ten teams participating, and they finished sixth overall.

IBSA World Games 

The 2003 IBSA World Games were held in Quebec City, Canada with 10 teams competing.  The first stage was pool play with 5 teams per pool and the top two teams in each pool advancing to the next round. The team made it out of the round robin round.  Spain finished fourth overall. 

The 2007 IBSA World Championships and Games were held in Brazil.  The women's goalball competition included thirteen teams, including this one.  The competition was a 2008 Summer Paralympics qualifying event.

Regional championships 

The team competes in the IBSA Europe goalball region. 

The 2001 European Championships were held in Neerpelt, Belgium with six teams competing.  The team finished fifth. In 2005, the European Championships were held in Neerpelt, Belgium.  With ten teams competing, the team finished fifth. 

The Turkish Blind Sports Federation hosted the 2007 IBSA Goalball European Championships in Anyalya, Turkey with 11 teams contesting the women's competition. The team finished fourth. 

Munich, Germany hosted the 2009 European Championships with eleven teams taking part.  The team finished the event in ninth place. 

Six teams took part in the 2010 IBSA European Championships Goalball Women B tournament held in Eskişehir, Turkey in July.  The team finished third. 

The team competed at the 2013 European Championships in Turkey, where they finished seventh.

Competitive history 

The table below contains individual game results for the team in international matches and competitions.

Goal scoring by competition

See also 

 Disabled sports 
 Spain at the Paralympics

References

Goalball women's
National women's goalball teams
Spain at the Paralympics
Goalball in Spain
European national goalball teams